Portrait of Giacomo Doria is a portrait of Giacomo Doria by Titian, painted in 1533–1535 and now in the Ashmolean Museum.

Paintings in the collection of the Ashmolean Museum
1535 paintings
Doria, Giacomo
Doria, Giacomo